Chheley Kaar is a 1954 Indian Bengali-language romantic comedy film directed by Chitta Basu and produced by Charan Chitra. This film received President's Silver Medal in National Film Award for Best Feature Film in Bengali in 1954. The film was remade in Hindi as Bandish starring Ashok Kumar and Meena Kumari. The film was also remade in Tamil as Yaar Paiyyan and in Malayalam as Bhagyamudra.

Plot
Tomato is an orphan lives with his adoptive father. His father is very sick, suffering from a virulent disease, and will die within a few months. He instructed Tomato to take shelter to a rich person, Kunal Sen. Tomato approaches Kunal in a park and calls him as father. Shocked, Kunal tries to escape from the unknown child Tomato, but cannot. After many obstacles and chaos, Kunal and his girlfriend Mili start loving Tomato.

Cast
 Bikash Roy as Kunal
 Bhanu Bannerjee as Monti
 Chhabi Biswas as Kunal's father
 Arundhati Devi as Mili
 Tulsi Chakraborty
 Nabadwip Haldar
 Jahor Roy as Rabin
 Suprava Mukherjee as Kunal's mother
 Jiben Bose
 Master Tiak as Tomato
 Santi Bhattacharya

References

External links
 

1954 films
Bengali-language Indian films
1950s romantic comedy-drama films
Indian romantic comedy-drama films
Bengali films remade in other languages
Best Bengali Feature Film National Film Award winners
1950s Bengali-language films
1954 comedy films
1953 comedy films
1953 films
1953 drama films
1954 drama films
Indian black-and-white films